Acleros mackenii, the Macken's skipper or Macken's dart, is a butterfly of the family Hesperiidae. It is found in Western, Eastern and Southern Africa.

The wingspan is 27–32 mm for males and 29–33 mm for females. Adults are on wing year-round but are more common in late summer, autumn and winter than in the hotter midsummer months.

The larvae feed on Rhus species (including Rhus corarius) and Acridocarpus species (including Acridocarpus smeathmanni).

Subspecies
Acleros mackenii mackenii (possibly Malawi, Zambia, Mozambique, Zimbabwe, Eswatini, South Africa: Limpopo Province, Mpumalanga, KwaZulu-Natal and the Eastern Cape Province)
Acleros mackenii olaus (Plötz, 1884) (Guinea, Senegal, Sierra Leone, Liberia, Ivory Coast, Ghana, Togo, Nigeria, Cameroon, Central African Republic, Democratic Republic Congo, southern Sudan, Rwanda, Burundi)
Acleros mackenii instabilis Mabille, 1890 (Democratic Republic of the Congo, Uganda, Kenya, Tanzania, Ethiopia)

References

Butterflies described in 1868
Erionotini
Butterflies of Africa
Taxa named by Roland Trimen